Planguenoual (Gallo: Plangenóau) is a former commune in the Côtes-d'Armor department of Brittany in northwestern France. On 1 January 2019, it was merged into the new commune Lamballe-Armor.

Population

Inhabitants of Planguenoual are called planguenoualais in French.

See also
Communes of the Côtes-d'Armor department

References

External links

Former communes of Côtes-d'Armor